USS Conasauga (AOG-15) was a Halawa-class gasoline tanker acquired by the United States Navy for the dangerous task of transporting gasoline to warships in the fleet, and to remote Navy stations.

Conasauga was completed in 1932 as New York Socony by Bethlehem Shipbuilding Corp., Sparrows Point, Maryland; acquired by the Navy 23 March 1943, and commissioned 19 April 1943.

World War II service 

Sailing from New York 1 May 1943, Conasauga arrived at Oran 28 May. She was attached to Commander Naval Forces, North African Waters, and carried gasoline to various ports in the Mediterranean.

Decommissioning 

Conasauga was decommissioned and transferred to France under lend lease 25 December 1944. The name was Lac Blanc. She was returned 17 October 1945 at Palermo, and her equipment was salvaged and her hulk sold 19 December 1945.

References

External links 
 
 

Halawa-class gasoline tankers
World War II auxiliary ships of the United States
1931 ships
Ships built in Sparrows Point, Maryland